Pseudo-Hyginus (Latin for "False Hyginus") may refer to:

 The author of the work De Astronomica credited to G. Julius Hyginus
 The author of the work De Munitionibus Castrorum credited to Hyginus Gromaticus